.kn is the Internet country code top-level domain (ccTLD) for Saint Kitts and Nevis. It is administered by the University of Puerto Rico, Central Administration.

Second level domains

Registrations are allowed directly at the second level, and there are also some third-level registrations beneath these second-level names:

 COM.KN: Commercial (unrestricted)
 NET.KN: Networks (unrestricted)
 ORG.KN: Organizations (unrestricted)
 EDU.KN: Educational institutions
 GOV.KN: Governmental institutions

External links
 IANA .kn whois information
 Dot KN Registry

Country code top-level domains
Communications in Saint Kitts and Nevis

sv:Toppdomän#K